Shital Shah is an Indian film director, actor and writer, known for her works in Gujarati cinema. She is known for directing films such as Hutututu: Aavi Ramat Ni Rutu (2016), Duniyadari (2017 film) (2017), and Saatam Aatham (2022).

Filmography

Actor

Director

References

External links
 

Living people
Year of birth missing (living people)
Gujarati-language film directors
21st-century Indian film directors
Indian women screenwriters
Gujarati people
Film directors from Gujarat